A bridge graft is used to supply nutrients to the rootstock of a woody perennial when the bark, and therefore the conductive tissues, have been removed from part of the trunk.  This wound is often caused by rabbits or other rodents, stripping the bark away and girdling the tree.  The inability of the plant to transport food manufactured in the leaves down to the root system, causes the root system to die and in the death cycle, the resulting lack of root system causes the upper portions of the plant to die. Where one-quarter or less of the trunk circumference has been girdled, it may not be necessary to use this technique.  It is also difficult on small caliper tree trunks.  A bridge graft uses scions to 'bridge' the gap.  Each scion is taper cut in order to accommodate the need for matching the cambium layers of the scion with those of the tree being repaired.  Once in place the graft wounds must be completely sealed to prevent moving of tissues which would inhibit them from joining together and to prevent dissection of the site which would lead to the death of the scions.

Steps 

This link to an Ontario Ministry of Agriculture Factsheet gives details and diagrams for the technique.
 However, modern arboriculture suggests that the application of pruning paints and wound dressings can inhibit the trees' natural defenses, so a person attempting this technique may try it without the application of wound dressing prior to the graft insertion.  Most trees will produce callus tissues compartmentalize the wounded area.  This natural defense is stimulated by environmental factors which may include the presence of the 'first arrivals' of fungi and bacteria on the wet wound.  For more about this natural protection refer to 'New Tree Biology'

Materials 

Grafting wax
Grafting knife
Raffia (used to secure the graft prior to waxing)
Scions

Horticulture